Johann Nepomuk Ritter von Nussbaum (2 September 1829 – 31 October 1890) was a German surgeon who was a native of Munich.

In 1853, he earned his medical doctorate from the University of Munich, where he studied under Karl Thiersch (1822–1895) and Franz Christoph von Rothmund (1801–1891). In the following years he continued his surgical studies with Auguste Nélaton (1807–1873), Charles Chassaignac (1805–79) and Jules Maisonneuve (1809–1897) in Paris, and under Bernhard von Langenbeck (1810–1887) in Berlin. During the early 1870s, he travelled to England, where he learned techniques of pelvic surgery under Thomas Spencer Wells (1818–1897). From 1860 until 1890 Nussbaum was a professor of surgery at the University of Munich. During the Franco-Prussian War he served as a medical consultant for Bavarian troops.

Nussbaum is remembered for the development of innovative surgical operations, and the introduction of Lister's antiseptic practices into surgery at Munich. Prior to antisepsis at Munich, there was an extremely high rate of death due to operative infection. Nussbaum's popular book on antiseptic treatment of wounds, Leitfaden zur antiseptischen Wundbehandlung, was later translated into several languages.

He also published significant works on eye surgery, ovariotomy and bone transplantation. A device designed for use with writer's cramp,  "Nussbaum's bracelet", is named after him.  

He is buried in the Alter Südfriedhof in Munich, Germany.

References

This article incorporates information based on a translation of an equivalent article at the German Wikipedia.
 The Broad Spectrum of Surgery in Munich

Mondofacto Dictionary (definition of eponym)

1829 births
1890 deaths
German surgeons
Academic staff of the Ludwig Maximilian University of Munich
Physicians from Munich
Burials at the Alter Südfriedhof